Dev Sanskriti Vishwavidyalaya (Dev Sanskriti, or simply "DSVV") is an Indian university located at Shantikunj near Haridwar city in state of Uttarakhand.
Established in 2002 by the act of the Uttarakhand Legislative Assembly it is a fully residential university. Run by Shri Vedmata Gayatri Trust, Shantikunj, Haridwar (headquarters of All World Gayatri Pariwar), it provides various degree, diploma and certificate courses in areas like clinical psychology, Yogic science, alternative therapy, Indian culture, tourism, rural management, theology, spiritual counseling etc. It also provides courses through distance learning mode.

Brahmavarchas Shodh Sansthan
Brahmavarchas Shodh Sansthan, or Brahmavarchas Research Institute (in English) is situated on the bank of the Ganges, about half a kilometer from Shantikunj, Haridwar, in India. Equipped with a state of the art laboratory, a library and a botanical garden containing rare ayurvedic herbs, the institute is working on unique projects such as Yagyopathy, Ayurveda and Vedic mantras

Pandit Shriram Sharma Acharya established the Institute as a center for inter communion of science and spirituality, where interrelation between these two aspects is studied. The prime aim of setting up this Institute is to establish the ancient Indian Yogic Philosophy as the science and art of living.

The Institute is dedicated to the integration of modern and ancient Indian sciences in a practical way motivated by the goal of health and happiness for all. Innovative scientific research aimed at grassroots applications is being carried out in the ancient sciences in collaboration with the relevant modern sciences. Major areas of research include Ayurveda and Yagyopathy, total psychology, the science of Vedic mantras and its therapeutic applications, the philosophy and science of yoga, Sadhana, mantra and tantra and the science of spirituality.

The Institute houses well-equipped laboratories of hematology, biochemistry, neurophysiology, cardiology, phytochemistry, psychometry, Yagyopathy etc. Apart from its own team of doctors, engineers, scientists and philosophers, the center has live interaction with the hospital, ayurvedic pharmacy and yoga laboratories of Shantikunj, some of the hospitals and universities in and around Haridwar. Distinguished researchers, professors and other experts also visit the center regularly.

The Institute has been conducting scientific experiments to investigate the effects of Ayurveda  and herbal medicine, yog sadhana, yajna, gayatri-sadhana and panch karma, on different bodily and mental functions. The subjects (experimental and the control groups) are the trainees of the sadhana programmes/camps of spiritual refinement and personality development organized regularly at Shantikunj.

See also
Sanskriti University

References

External links 
 Official website of Dev Sanskriti Vishwavidyalaya (Haridwar)
 Brahmavarchas Shodh Sansthan on the website for Devsanskriti Vishwavidyalaya
  All World Gayatri Pariwar
 DSVV page at eUttaranchal.com

Organizations established in 1979
Research institutes in Uttarakhand
Brahmavarchas Shodh Sansthan 
Universities and colleges in Uttarakhand
Buildings and structures in Haridwar
Haridwar district
Educational institutions established in 2002
2002 establishments in Uttarakhand